Joseph Lindsay (13 November 1858 – 12 October 1933) was a Scottish footballer.

Career
Lindsay played for Dumbarton, Rangers, Renton and the Scotland national team.

Honours
Dumbarton
 Scottish Cup: Winners 1882–83 – Runners Up 1880–81;1881–82
 Dumbartonshire Cup: Winners 1884–85
 Glasgow Charity Cup: Runners Up 1881–82;1884–85
 8 caps for Scotland between 1880 and 1886, scoring 6 goals
 7 representative caps between 1881 and 1890 (4 for Dumbartonshire – and 3 for Scotch Counties, scoring 2 goals)
 9 international trial matches for Scotland between 1878 and 1886.

International goals
Scores and results list Scotland's goal tally first.

See also
 List of Scotland national football team hat-tricks

References

External links

Joe Lindsay (Dumbarton Football Club Historical Archive)
London Hearts Profile

1858 births
Scottish footballers
Scotland international footballers
Dumbarton F.C. players
Rangers F.C. players
1933 deaths
Renton F.C. players
Association football forwards
Place of death missing